Rob Gardner (born 1977) is an American Latter-day Saint composer of primarily oratorios. One of his most widely performed works is his oratorio Lamb of God about the death and resurrection of Jesus Christ. It was recorded by the London Symphony Orchestra at Air Studios in London in June 2010.

Gardner was born and raised in Mesa, Arizona in a Latter-day Saint family. He served a mission for the Church of Jesus Christ of Latter-day Saints in the Bordeaux France mission. He attended Brigham Young University for his undergrad and the University of Southern California's film and television composition program.

Among the oratorios by Gardner are He is Jesus Christ, Joseph Smith the Prophet, Saints and Pioneers and Lamb of God. He composed and conducted the production of the YouTube video Manger of Bethlehem. He also has composed the musicals, Blackbeard and "The Price of Freedom" (with Mckane Davis).

Gardner is also a co-founder and president of the nonprofit organization Spire Music. He also helped found the group Cinematic Pop.

Sources
Deseret News, Dec. 13, 2012 article on Gardner
Mormon Artist interview with Gardner
San Francisco Classical Voice article on Lamb of God performance
Mlive article on Lamb of God
New Musical Theatre article on Gardner
Arizona Republic article on Gardner's work

1978 births
Living people
Latter Day Saints from Arizona
American male composers
Brigham Young University alumni
Musicians from Mesa, Arizona
21st-century American composers
21st-century composers
University of Southern California alumni
Mormon missionaries in France